Roberto Dellasega (born 15 June 1990) is an Italian ski jumper who has competed since 2006. At the 2010 Winter Olympics, he finished 44th in the qualifying round of the individual large hill event while being disqualified in the individual normal hill event.

Dellasega, born in Cavalese, placed third in the large hill event of the 2009 Italian championships of ski jumping. His best World Cup finish was ninth in a team large hill event at Germany in 2010 while his best individual finish was 29th in an individual large hill event at Japan that same year.

References

1990 births
Italian male ski jumpers
Living people
Ski jumpers at the 2010 Winter Olympics
Ski jumpers at the 2014 Winter Olympics
Olympic ski jumpers of Italy
People from Cavalese
Sportspeople from Trentino